George H. Kroncke (February 8, 1837 – June 27, 1915) was an American farmer and politician.

Born in Germany, Kroncke settled in the town of Randall, Kenosha County, Wisconsin in 1872 and was a farmer. Kroncke served as a justice of the peace, on the school board and was a Democrat. In 1893, Kroncke was elected, in a special election, to the Wisconsin State Assembly replacing Daniel A. Mahoney who died in office. Kroncke died at his home in Kenosha, Wisconsin.

Notes

External links

1837 births
1915 deaths
German emigrants to the United States
People from Randall, Wisconsin
Farmers from Wisconsin
School board members in Wisconsin
19th-century American politicians
Politicians from Kenosha, Wisconsin
Democratic Party members of the Wisconsin State Assembly